WDKT-LD, virtual channel 31 (UHF digital channel 15), is a low-powered GEB America-affiliated television station licensed to Hendersonville, North Carolina, United States. Owned by Carolina Christian Broadcasting, it is sister to Greenville, South Carolina-licensed religious independent station WGGS-TV (channel 16). The two stations share studios on Rutherford Road in Taylors, South Carolina; WDKT-LD's transmitter is located at Paris Mountain State Park (just outside Greenville).

The station signed on in 1994 as W31AZ, a translator of WGGS-TV; it began airing separate programming in 2019.

Digital channels
The station's digital signal is multiplexed:

References

External links

Low-power television stations in the United States
Television channels and stations established in 1994
1994 establishments in North Carolina
DKT-LD
Religious television stations in the United States
Laff (TV network) affiliates
Grit (TV network) affiliates
Heroes & Icons affiliates
Decades (TV network) affiliates
Buzzr affiliates
Hendersonville, North Carolina